"Can't Give You Anything (But My Love)" is a 1975 single by The Stylistics. It reached number one for three weeks in the UK in August 1975.

After splitting from record producer Thom Bell in 1974, songwriters/producers Hugo & Luigi and George David Weiss took over, with arrangements by Van McCoy. Although the split with Bell negatively affected the group in the US, The Stylistics continued to be popular in the UK and this was their first and only UK number one single. The track reached number 51 on the US Billboard Hot 100, and number 18 on the corresponding US R&B chart.

Chart performance

Weekly charts

Year-end charts

Thomas Anders version

The cover version by Thomas Anders was the second single off his second album, Whispers. The single included versions in both English and Spanish ("Más que amor").

Track listings 
7" single EastWest 9031-75025-7 (Warner), 08.1991
 "Can't Give You Anything (But My Love)" – 4:10
 "Más que amor" – 4:09

12" Single EastWest 9031-76005-0 (Warner), 08.1991
 'Can't Give You Anything (But My Love)" (Basic Love Mix) – 5:07
 "Más que amor" (Spanish Club Mix) – 5:09
 "Can't Give You Anything (But My Love)" (Instrumental Groove Mix) – 5:11

CD-Maxi EastWest 9031-75026-2 (Warner), 08.1991
 "Can't Give You Anything (But My Love)" (Radio version) – 4:10
 "Can't Give You Anything (But My Love)" (Extended version) — 6:43
 "Más que amor" (Extended version) — 6:44
 "Más que amor" — 4:09

Chart positions 
The single stayed five weeks on the German charts, from October 14 to November 24, 1991, peaking at number 73.

Credits 
 Producer: Mike Paxman and Paul Muggleton 
 Publisher: Music Sales Crop, Melodie der Welt MV 
 Mix: Mark "Tufte" Evans
 Lyrics: George David Weiss
 Spanish lyrics: Gómez y Argandoña G.
 Music: George David Weiss
 Chorus: Judie Tzuke, Paul Muggleton, Don Snow, Deborah Robson

See also
List of number-one singles from the 1970s (UK)

References

Further reading

External links
 

1975 singles
The Stylistics songs
Songs written by Hugo Peretti
Songs written by Luigi Creatore
Songs written by George David Weiss
UK Singles Chart number-one singles
Irish Singles Chart number-one singles
1975 songs
1991 singles
Thomas Anders songs
Avco Records singles